Rendville is a village in Perry County, Ohio, United States. The population was 34 at the 2010 census, making it the smallest incorporated community in Ohio.

History
Rendville was founded in 1879 by William P. Rend, and named for him. A post office was established at Rendville in 1879, and remained in operation until 1982.

Geography
Rendville is located at  (39.617164, -82.089334), along Sunday Creek.

Demographics

2010 census
As of the census of 2010, there were 36 people, 18 households, and 11 families living in the village. The racial makeup of the village was 80.6% White, 8.3% African American, and 11.1% from two or more races.

There were 18 households, of which 16.7% had children under the age of 18 living with them, 38.9% were married couples living together, 16.7% had a female householder with no husband present, 5.6% had a male householder with no wife present, and 38.9% were non-families. 22.2% of all households were made up of individuals, and 5.6% had someone living alone who was 65 years of age or older. The average household size was 2.00 and the average family size was 2.27.

The median age in the village was 54.5 years. 11.1% of residents were under the age of 18; 8.5% were between the ages of 18 and 24; 8.4% were from 25 to 44; 44.5% were from 45 to 64; and 27.8% were 65 years of age or older. The gender makeup of the village was 44.4% male and 55.6% female.

2000 census
As of the census of 2000, there were 46 people, 19 households, and 12 families living in the village. The population density was 148.5 people per square mile (57.3/km). There were 30 housing units at an average density of 96.8 per square mile (37.4/km). The racial makeup of the village was 86.96% White, 10.87% African American, and 2.17% from two or more races.

There were 19 households, out of which 31.6% had children under the age of 18 living with them, 52.6% were married couples living together, 15.8% had a female householder with no husband present, and 31.6% were non-families. 31.6% of all households were made up of individuals, and 15.8% had someone living alone who was 65 years of age or older. The average household size was 2.42 and the average family size was 3.08.

In the village, the population was spread out, with 26.1% under the age of 18, 10.9% from 18 to 24, 28.3% from 25 to 44, 17.4% from 45 to 64, and 17.4% who were 65 years of age or older. The median age was 36 years. For every 100 females there were 91.7 males. For every 100 females age 18 and over, there were 112.5 males.

The median income for a household in the village was $38,750, and the median income for a family was $39,583. Males had a median income of $28,125 versus $26,250 for females. The per capita income for the village was $17,002. There were 15.8% of families and 13.2% of the population living below the poverty line, including no under eighteens and 45.5% of those over 64.

References

Villages in Perry County, Ohio
Villages in Ohio
1879 establishments in Ohio
Populated places established in 1879